Acrolophus leucodocis is a moth of the family Acrolophidae. It was described by Zeller in 1877. It is found in North America.

References

Moths described in 1877
leucodocis